The World as It Is Today is the third and last album by English avant-rock group Art Bears. It was recorded at Sunrise Studio in Kirchberg, Switzerland between 24 August and 7 September 1980, and was first released in 1981.

For technical reasons, the original release of this album on LP vinyl record was pressed on a 12" disc at 45-rpm, and not the usual 33⅓ rpm.

Contents
The World as It Is Today comprises 11 songs, all composed by Fred Frith with texts by Chris Cutler. The last song, "Albion, Awake!" was recorded as an instrumental because Dagmar Krause objected strongly to the violent nature of the lyrics. The lyrics for "Albion, Awake!", however, still appear in the booklet accompanying the album. In 2013 the lyrics were set to music for Áine O'Dwyer's album Anything Bright or Startling?

Track listing
All tracks composed by Fred Frith and Chris Cutler.

Personnel
 Fred Frith – guitars, keyboards, viola, violin, xylophone
 Chris Cutler – drums, electric drums, noise
 Dagmar Krause – vocals

Sound and art work
Produced by Art Bears and Etienne Conod
Cover art by Art Bear IV

CD reissues
In 1988 The World as It Is Today and Art Bears' previous album Winter Songs were re-issued together on a single CD entitled 25 Songs. 
The album was also re-issued in 2004 as part of The Art Box a boxed set of six CDs, which included all the material released by the band, together with live and unreleased tracks, plus remixes by other musicians.

References

External links

1981 albums
Art Bears albums
Recommended Records albums